Fantastična is the sixth studio album by Bosnian pop singer Donna Ares. It was released 14 May 2009 through BN Music in Bosnia and Herzegovina and Hrkalović Production in Serbia. The album was successful and broke sales records within the first weeks of its release.

The album contained an eclectic mix of pop, folk, rock and house music. Many listeners likened the style of several of the songs to the 1980s music of Lepa Brena.

Track listing

Personnel

Instruments

Hamdija Mešić – guitar
Almir Nezić – bass guitar (3, 6)
Džavid Ljubovci – guitar

Production and recording

Donna Ares – arrangement
Džavid Ljubovci – arrangement, producing
Nino M – arrangement
Hamdija Mešić – arrangement

Crew

Donna Ares – design
Džavid Ljubovci – photography

References

2009 albums
Donna Ares albums
BN Music albums